The Velvet Club was an alternative music club in Rimini, Italy. The club has hosted many notable bands since its opening in 1989, at that time it was known as Velvet Perestrojka. It was founded by Thomas Balsamini and was the continuation of the Slego which closed its doors in 2000 after 21 years of existence.

Some past concerts

References

Bibliography
Elisa Genghini, 101 cose da fare in Romagna, Roma, Newton Compton, 2009. 
Arturo Compagnoni, Italia '80. Il Rock indipendente italiano negli anni Ottanta

External links 
 Official website

Nightclubs in Italy
Music venues in Italy
Former music venues